The following lists events that have happened in 1808 in the Sublime State of Persia.

Incumbents
 Monarch: Fat′h-Ali Shah Qajar

Birth
 January 5 – Mohammad Shah Qajar, third king of Qajar dynasty, was born in Tabriz, Iran.

References

 
Persia
Years of the 19th century in Iran
1800s in Iran
Persia